Christine Brown (born September 1938)  is an Indian track-and-field athlete. She won a gold medal in 4×100m relay (with Stephie d'Souza, Violet Peters and Mary d'Souza) and bronze in the 100 metres in the 1954 Asian Games. This was the first gold by an Indian women's team at the Asian Games.  Mary D'Souza, Pat Mendonca, Banoo Gulzar and Roshan Mistry had won a silver in the same event in 1951.

In the inter school athletics competition in Bangalore in 1953 Brown, then a fifteen year old student of Baldwin Girls High School, broke the national long jump record with a jump of 17' 4" and equaled the 100m record of 12.4 seconds .

References

Indian female sprinters
Athletes (track and field) at the 1954 Asian Games
Athletes (track and field) at the 1958 Asian Games
Asian Games gold medalists for India
Asian Games bronze medalists for India
Asian Games medalists in athletics (track and field)
Possibly living people
Medalists at the 1954 Asian Games
Medalists at the 1958 Asian Games
1938 births